Concho Valley Electric Cooperative, Inc. is a non-profit rural electric utility cooperative headquartered in San Angelo, Texas.

The Cooperative was organized in 1940.

The Cooperative serves portions of 10 counties in the state of Texas, in a territory generally surrounding San Angelo (including portions thereof) and the Concho River.

Currently the Cooperative has over 4,300 miles of line and over 14,200 meters.

External links
Concho Valley Electric Cooperative

Companies based in San Angelo, Texas
Electric cooperatives in Texas
Coke County, Texas
Concho County, Texas
Glasscock County, Texas
Irion County, Texas
Mitchell County, Texas
Nolan County, Texas
Reagan County, Texas
Runnels County, Texas
Sterling County, Texas
Tom Green County, Texas